{{DISPLAYTITLE:C14H20ClNO2}}
The molecular formula C14H20ClNO2 (molar mass: 269.76 g/mol, exact mass: 269.1183 u) may refer to:

 Acetochlor, an herbicide
 Alachlor, an herbicide

Molecular formulas